Howell is an unincorporated community in St. Charles County, in the U.S. state of Missouri.  Much of the community has been annexed by St. Peters.

History
A post office called Howell was established in 1900, and remained in operation until 1917. The community has the name of Francis Howell, a local educator. Jazz pianists Ralph Sutton and Barbara Sutton Curtis were from Howell.

References

Unincorporated communities in St. Charles County, Missouri
Unincorporated communities in Missouri